Christopher Wade (died 1555) was an English Protestant martyr. His story is recorded in Foxe's Book of Martyrs.

He was executed by burning in July 1555, on the same day as Margaret Polley, in Dartford, Kent. He had been condemned by Maurice Griffith, bishop of Rochester.

References

People from Dartford
1555 deaths
People executed under Mary I of England
People executed for heresy
Executed British people
16th-century Protestant martyrs
Year of birth unknown
Executed English people
People executed by the Kingdom of England by burning
Protestant martyrs of England